Daniela von Arnim (born 10 July 1964 in Munich) is a German bridge player. Sometime prior to the 2014 European and World meets (summer and October), she ranked 35th among 73 Women World Grand Masters by world masterpoints (MP) and 13th by placing points that do not decay over time. (Her longtime partner Sabine Auken played Open and Mixed events with Roy Welland in 2014, rather than enter Women events.)

Arnim, or Von Arnim, is a 2-time world champion winning the Venice Cup in 1995 and 2001.

Bridge accomplishments

Wins

 Venice Cup (2) 1995, 2001 
 North American Bridge Championships (8)
 Machlin Women's Swiss Teams (2) 1990, 2011 
 Wagar Women's Knockout Teams (3) 2005, 2007, 2011 
 Sternberg Women's Board-a-Match Teams (3) 2005, 2009, 2010

Runners-up

 Venice Cup (3) 1993, 2005, 2007 
 World Women Pairs Championship (1) 1998
 Buffett Cup (1) 2006
 North American Bridge Championships (3)
 Blue Ribbon Pairs (1) 2005 
 Sternberg Women's Board-a-Match Teams (1) 2002 
 Chicago Mixed Board-a-Match (1) 2006

References

External links
 
 

German contract bridge players
Venice Cup players
Living people
Daniela
1964 births